The Second Coming was Little Richard's third album for Reprise Records, released in 1972. The album saw him reunited with Robert "Bumps" Blackwell from his Specialty days, with them co-writing the majority of the album together. The concept was to unite the best rock studio musicians of the '50s with the best rock studio musicians of the '70s. The album failed to chart.

History
Little Richard's profile was high during this period, with works including a track, "Miss Ann", on the album To Bonnie from Delaney, a still unreleased track with Joey Covington of The Jefferson Airplane and Hot Tuna, "Bludgeon of a Bluecoat (The Man)", a duet with Mylon LeFevre on his 1972 release, "He's Not Just a Soldier", a cover of his 1961 Mercury track, and two tracks on the soundtrack to $. He also cut "But I Try" with The James Gang (unreleased until 2013), and "Rockin' With the King", with Canned Heat, in late 1971. However, his own records weren't selling, and a fourth (apparently planned as his third) and final album for Reprise - Southern Child - was dropped from release. The tracks to all of Richard's Reprise sessions, including the Southern Child album, were finally released on CD in 2005 by Rhino Records.

Second Coming was recorded in 1972, at the Record Plant, in Los Angeles, California, and employed top 1950s and 1970s players. Whereas the previous Reprise album, King of Rock and Roll was considered to be under-produced and too commercial, the third released album was considered vastly over-produced, yet featuring little of the star himself. To wit, the 7 minute, one-chord instrumental, "Satisfied, Sanctified, Toe-Tapper", was a standout.

Richard recalled: "I left Reprise because I felt that the producers didn't have me at heart. The Rill Thing was a good album. All the Reprise albums were, but they didn't push them. So I left them. It wasn't mutual. I went to Reprise because I felt the company could do something. [...] I think the producers and people who worked there thought I wasn't their main singer." (page 167).

Track listing
All tracks composed by Richard Penniman; except where indicated
 "Mockingbird Sally" - 3:41
 "Second Line" (Penniman, Robert "Bumps" Blackwell) – 4:50
 "It Ain't What You Do, It's the Way How You Do It" (Penniman, Pete Kleinman) – 2:45
 "The Saints" – 5:03
 "Nuki Suki" (Bill Hemmons) – 5:32
 "Rockin' Rockin' Boogie" (Penniman, Seabrun Hunter) – 5:28
 "Prophet of Peace" – 3:19
 "Thomasine" (Penniman, Maybelle Jackson) – 3:11
 "Sanctified, Satisfied Toe-Tapper" – 7:12

Personnel
Little Richard – vocals, piano, electric piano, Clavichord
Lee Allen, Bill Hemmons - tenor saxophone
Jim Horn - baritone saxophone
Chuck Rainey - bass
Sneaky Pete Kleinow - pedal steel guitar
Mike Deasey, George Davis, Adolph Jacobs, David T. Walker - guitar 
Earl Palmer - drums
Technical
Ed Thrasher - art direction
David Willardson - cover artwork
Ed Caraeff - photography

Charts
Album

Single

References

1972 albums
Little Richard albums
Albums produced by Robert Blackwell
Reprise Records albums